Ofelia Hooper Polo (13 November 1900, in Las Minas, Panama – 23 September 1981) was a Panamanian Sociologist, poet, professor,  researcher, and civil rights activist.

She was the daughter of  Maurice Hooper and  Olimpia Polo Valdés. She worked at several print media in Panama, including La Antena (1931) and the Frontera (1937); she also edited Primicias in 1927. Together with Eda Nela, she was one of the first proponents of the avant-garde in Panamanian poetry.

She was one of the pioneers of the field of Sociology in Panama, together with Demetrio Porras (1898–1972) and Georgina Jiménez de López (1904–1994). She was also a pioneering researcher of Agriculture in Panama.

Works 
 Aspects of rural social life in Panama (1945)
 Sketch of the rural Panamanian man (1969)

References 

Panamanian poets
Panamanian women poets
Panamanian sociologists
Panamanian women sociologists
Panamanian feminists
People from Las Minas District
1900 births
1981 deaths
Panamanian women writers
20th-century poets
20th-century women writers
Panamanian women academics
20th-century Panamanian women writers
20th-century Panamanian writers